Xam may refer to:

 XAM, a storage standard
 Xẩm, a type of Vietnamese folk music
 ǀXam language, an extinct language of South Africa